The rivière de la Fourche (in English: river of the Fork) crosses the municipality of Saint-Philémon (MRC Les Etchemins Regional County Municipality), as well as Notre-Dame-Auxiliatrice-de-Buckland and Armagh, in the Bellechasse Regional County Municipality, in the administrative region of Chaudière-Appalaches, in Quebec, in Canada .

The Fourche River is a tributary of the south shore of the rivière du Sud (Montmagny) which flows north-west, then north-east to the south shore of the St. Lawrence River.

Toponymy 
The Fourche river takes its name from the fact that the three head waterways (rivière des Orignaux, brook of Milieu and brook Beaudoin) converge together, forming a fork on the maps geographical areas, the handle of which points to the north-west.

The toponym “rivière de la Fourche” was made official on September 11, 1987, at the Commission de toponymie du Québec.

See also 

 List of rivers of Quebec

References 

Rivers of Chaudière-Appalaches
Bellechasse Regional County Municipality
Les Etchemins Regional County Municipality